The 2008 European Individual Speedway Junior Championship was the eleventh edition of UEM Individual Speedway Junior European Championship. The Final took place on 30 August 2008 in Stralsund, Germany; it was second Final in Germany. Defending European Champion was Nicolai Klindt from Denmark who won in 2007 Final in Częstochowa, Poland.

Calendar 
 - Semi-finals
 - Final

Allocation 
References

Qualifying for the Final:
 Riders placed 1st to 5th + 1R in Semi-Final 1 and Semi-Final 2 will qualify for the Final.
 Riders placed 1st to 6th in Semi-Final 3 will qualify for the Final. But, if no Germany riders qualify for the Final, then only 5 riders will qualify from Semi-Final 3.

Domestic Qualifications

Poland 
  (Final of Domestic Qualification to Individual European Championship)

Semi-finals

Final 
Final
2008-08-30 (4:00 pm)
 Stralsund
Referee:
Jury President:
Changes:
(12)  Matěj Kůs → Facher → Andersson
(15)  Jonas Messing → (18) Eklöf
(17)  Maksims Bogdanovs → None

References

2008
European Individual Junior